Football Femminile Lugano 1976 known as FF Lugano 1976 or simply Lugano are a Swiss women's football team from Lugano, Ticino who play domestically in the Frauen Nationalliga A.

Since 2015 and through their chairman Emanuele Gaiarin, encourage young American footballers who have played NCAA soccer to play for them by providing free accommodation and classes in Italian. Through this approach, they finished second in the 2018–19 season and made their European debut in the 2019–20 Women's Champions League. The majority of the current squad are American.

History
The club was founded in 1976 by Andrea Incerti, originally as AS Armonia Lugano but later, in 1983, the club was incorporated into  and renamed to FCF Rapid Lugano. They won their first league title in the 1988–89 season. 

From 1978 to 2009, the club organised an internationally renowned Easter tournament containing both domestic and international teams. Lugano won this tournament nine times, including three tournament wins in a row between 2005 and 2007. At the end of the 2006–07 season, FC Rapid Lugano finished in the last place and was relegated to the Nationalliga B. In the 2015–16 season, after its return to the Nationalliga A, the club changed its name and became Football Femminile Lugano 1976.

Players

Current squad

Former players
For details of current and former players, see :Category:FF Lugano 1976 players.

Record in UEFA Women's Champions League
Lugano made their Champions League debut in the 2019–20 season, losing in the round of 32 to Manchester City.

References

External links
 
 Facebook
 Twitter

Women's football clubs in Switzerland
Association football clubs established in 1976
Lugano